Naza is a Malaysian business conglomerate involved in many types of business ranging from motoring to education.

Naza is also a given name and surname. It may also refer to:
Naza Automotive Manufacturing, a Malaysian automobile manufacturer
Naza (artist), or Maria Nazareth Maia Rufino McFarren (born 1955), Brazilian painter
Naza (rapper), French rapper and singer of Congolese descent
Abdul Naza Alhassan (born 1990), Ghanaian football player

See also
NASA, the National Aeronautics and Space Administration, United States
Nazas, a city and seat of the municipality of Nazas, in the state of Durango, north-western Mexico